Kingston Bible College Academy (KBCA) was a fundamental Independent Baptist school located in Kingston, Nova Scotia. It was a private schooling facility that offered grades primary though twelve. The school colors were blue, purple, white and red. The school was established in 1936 by John J. Sidey. The school taught from a Christian perspective using a literalist interpretation of the Bible, supplements provincial textbooks with those from BJU Press and A Beka Book.

Crest
In 1985 KBCA introduced their current Academy crest. At the center of this crest is the Word of God and the verse Romans 8:29 which states the goal of Christian education. The lamp of knowledge at the top stands for intellectual development, the profile heads to the left stand for social development, and the victory wreath and torch to the right stand for physical development.

Principals
Beth Lennox is currently the principal of KBCA.  Lennox came to Canada in April 1961 to teach at the Academy and has served extensively as the mathematics teacher of the high school.
 Beth Lennox (19??-present)
 Daniel Freeman (1983-1992)
 Gertrude Palmer (1978-1983)
 Richard Jones (19??-1978)

See also
 Kingston Bible College

External links

Private schools in Nova Scotia
Elementary schools in Nova Scotia
Middle schools in Nova Scotia
High schools in Nova Scotia
Schools in Kings County, Nova Scotia
Christian schools in Canada
Educational institutions established in 1936
1936 establishments in Nova Scotia